Matecaña International Airport is an international airport serving the city of Pereira, Colombia. It also serves as an alternate airport for the cities of Armenia, Cartago, Manizales, Medellín, Cali and Bogotá.

There are steep dropoffs on the sides and ends of the runway. There is high terrain in all quadrants except south.

Information 
The airport was built between 1944 and 1947. Its first official flight was a C-47 piloted by captain Luis Carlos Londoño Iragorrion on 24 July 1947. The city of Pereira owns and manages the terminal building, while the operations are in charge of Aerocivil, being the only airport in Colombia under these conditions. It handles 75 percent of passengers in the coffee region, with an average of 30 daily commercial operations to different destinations.

The passenger terminal is a four-level building built in the early 1970s. The first level includes parking positions for the airplanes, and a baggage claim area. The second/main floor has the check-in counters, airline offices, and domestic and international arrival doors. The third floor has the general waiting room, toilets, stores, restaurants and cafés, free Internet Wi-Fi, a devices charging station, and a VIP lounge operated by Avianca. Also on this level is security access for the two domestic waiting rooms. The international waiting room is here, with an independent door to the duty-free and security areas. In 1991 two jetways were installed from the domestic waiting rooms. On the fourth level are the airport general offices, a chapel, and two footbridges connecting the terminal with the car parking area, which is in front of the main building.

A new cargo terminal was built to replace the original built in 1978. The new control tower is Colombia's second-most-advanced, behind the tower in El Dorado Airport of Bogotá, also recently built.

The terminal has easy access to public transportation, including taxi area, general bus service and an exclusive stop for the bus rapid transit system, Megabus.

Currently, the airport is under a full renovation process, improving aviation safety, comfort and security for users. A 21,000m² (68,897 ft²) completely new terminal is planned.

The runway was extended to 2,205 meters in 2014, to allow for full certification as an international airport.

In December 2016, the CSS Construction Company won the contract to demolish the current terminal and build the new terminal building. This is a public-private alliance in which the CSS company will operate the airport for 20 years while still returning some revenue to the city government. The construction began in November 2017. CSS Construction also has a 30 percent stake in the renovation at El Dorado International Airport in Bogota.

Airlines and destinations 

Matecaña International Airport has flights to ten domestic and international destinations. It offers connections to different cities in the Americas and Europe through El Dorado International Airport in Bogotá, Miami International Airport in the United States and Tocumen International Airport in Panama City. The following airlines operate regular scheduled and charter flights at the airport:

Statistics

See also
Transport in Colombia
List of airports in Colombia

References

External links 
Matecaña Airport at OurAirports

Buildings and structures in Pereira, Colombia
Airports in Colombia
Buildings and structures in Risaralda Department